Harold Carter may refer to:

 Harold Carter (footballer) (1900–1973), Australian rules footballer 
 Harold Carter, Baron Carter of Haslemere, British lawyer and peer
 Harold A. Carter (1937–2013), senior pastor of New Shiloh Baptist Church in Baltimore, Maryland
 Harold Burnell Carter (1910–2005), Australian scientist

See also  
 Harry Carter (disambiguation)